Cyclone Martin was an extremely violent European windstorm which crossed southern Europe on 27–28 December 1999, causing severe damage across France, Spain, Switzerland and Italy one day after Cyclone Lothar had affected similar areas. The storm caused 30 fatalities and €6 billion in damages. Combined with Lothar, Cyclone Martin is often referred to as the Storm of the Century in western and central Europe.

Meteorological history
December 1999 saw a series of heavy winter storms cross the North Atlantic and western Europe. In early December, Great Britain and Denmark were hit by Cyclone Anatol which caused severe damage in Denmark. A second storm then crossed Europe on 12 December.

A very deep and sizeable depression, named Cyclone Kurt, moved across Britain on the night of 24–25 December, analysed to have possibly reached a low of 938 mb between Scotland and Norway. This set up a large area of westerly flow into Europe, along which Cyclone Lothar was rapidly carried into mainland Europe. This highly unstable situation inevitably meant low predictability, and saw an unusually straight and strong jet stream (similar circumstances were also noted the day before the arrival of the Great Storm of 1987).

Following along the Jet Stream immediately behind Lothar, Cyclone Martin then struck France and central Europe from 26 to 28 December 1999.

Atmospheric conditions remained unstable over western Europe, and at the end of January 2000 two additional damaging storms crossed Denmark and the northern part of Germany.

Aftermath 
Cyclone Martin caused extensive damage to property and trees across southern France. The French and German national power grids were also left badly affected, with more than 200 electricity pylons destroyed.

Buildings and infrastructure suffered major damage throughout Martin's path, and mains power and safety systems were knocked out in many places. The storm surge from Cyclone Martin led to severe flooding at the Blayais Nuclear Power Plant, resulting in a Level 2 nuclear incident on the International Nuclear Event Scale.

Highest winds
Below is a table of the highest wind speeds recorded during Cyclone Martin.

See also 
 Cyclone Anatol

References

External links
 Met Office, University of Exeter & University of Reading Extreme Wind Storm Catalogue: Martin
 Eumetrain: Storm Catastrope Atlantic and Western Europe - Case Study 25 - 28 December 1999
  Les tempêtes en France
 Details of damage in France (pdf)

Martin
Martin
1999 meteorology
1999 in France
1999 in Italy
Martin
Martin
December 1999 events in Europe
1999 disasters in Italy
1999 disasters in France